Orvosi Hetilap (English: Hungarian Medical Journal) is a weekly medical journal published by the Lajos Markusovszky Foundation.

History
Orvosi Hetlap is the oldest medical journal in Hungary and the oldest presently published Hungarian journal in general, established in 1857 by Lajos Markusovszky. However, it was only the second medical journal in Hungary: the first was the Orvosi Tár (English: Medical Cabinet), established in 1831 by Pál Bugát, which stopped publication by the end of the Hungarian Revolution of 1848.

References

External links
 
`
General medical journals
Publications established in 1857
Weekly journals
Hungarian-language journals
1857 establishments in the Austrian Empire